"Black Destroyer" is a science fiction short story by Canadian-American writer A. E. van Vogt, first published in Astounding SF in July 1939. It has been marked as the story that represents the start of the Golden Age of Science Fiction.

"Black Destroyer" was combined with several other short stories to form the novel The Voyage of the Space Beagle. It was claimed as an inspiration for the movie Alien and van Vogt collected an out-of-court settlement of $50,000 from 20th Century Fox.

Plot summary
A Coeurl, a large, intelligent, black cat-like animal, considers its near-future starvation as its food source of id-creatures has been hunted to extinction. Just as all seems lost, a spaceship lands near an abandoned Coeurl city and id-creatures pour out. He quickly surmises they are a scientific expedition from another star, which excites him as he considers scientists to be unlikely to harm him. He approaches them as if simply curious. The human expedition is first concerned about the Coeurl's approach, but he shows himself to be intelligent and attempting to communicate via radio waves. Assuming an intelligent species would be as curious about them as they are about him, they show him their ship. The Coeurl begins to plan to kill all of the men onboard and then fly to wherever they came from so he will have unlimited id.

Tortured by his long starvation, the Coeurl kills a man that went off exploring and eats his id. Examining the body, the humans discover it has been drained of all its phosphorus, and conclude the Coeurl is the killer. To test their theory, they bring the Coeurl a bowl of phosphorus, which he attacks with relish and almost kills the person who delivered it. They lock him up, but the Coeurl's ability to control "vibrations of every description" allows him to easily open the electric lock. He waits until they are sleeping and then kills several crew members before returning to the cage. This does not fool the men, and they begin planning ways to kill him.

Using his powers to control energy, the Coeurl causes the rear wall of the cage to dissolve and locks himself in the engine room. He uses the ship's power to reinforce the walls of the room so the men cannot blast their way in, and then sends the craft into space at high acceleration. The men plan a complex counterattack based on emitting a confusing blast of discordant vibrations. While they plan, the Coeurl builds a tiny spacecraft in the engine room's machine shop. He escapes in his ship just as they put their plan into action. However, the Coeurl is unaware of the ship's ability to instantly maneuver, and after a few moments, he notices the ship has reappeared in front of him. He goes mad with fury and destroys himself rather than face death at the hands of the humans.

Considering the situation, the men decide they must return to the planet and kill the other Coeurl. The ship's biologist is stunned when he learns the plan is to simply wait for them to come to the ship. But the key to the plan is a proper understanding of their enemy; the ship's archaeologist had concluded that the Coeurl is a member of the race that constructed the dead cities they explored on the planet and that they have reverted to a criminal state after an unimaginably long time of isolation and starvation. Knowing humanity's own criminal past, he concludes that "It was history, honorable Mr. Smith, our knowledge of history that defeated him."

Publication
Van Vogt got his start as an author writing "true confession" stories for pulp magazines in the 1930s. He switched to science fiction and submitted his first SF story, "Vault of the Beast", to Astounding but received a positive rejection letter. Encouraged, he submitted "Black Destroyer" and it was promoted as the cover story.

The story was re-used in 1950 as the basis for the first six chapters of The Voyage of the Space Beagle, Van Vogt's first and most famous fix-up novel. Several minor changes were made to the Coeurl; the tentacles that act as receptors and fingers now end in suction cups, and the dietary chemical was changed from phosphorus to potassium. The story also postulates they were the servants of the original race.

Van Vogt's next story, December 1939's "Discord in Scarlet", formed chapters 13 through 21 of the same book. Taken together, they describe almost invincible alien animals being taken aboard a spaceship so they can lay eggs within the crew. The plot of these two portions of Space Beagle so closely matched the plot of Alien that van Vogt sued the production company for plagiarism. The suit was eventually settled out of court for $50,000.

The story, in its original form, has appeared in anthologies on occasion.

Reception
The same July 1939 issue of Astounding also contained Isaac Asimov's first story to appear in the magazine, "Trends", while the next issue included the first story by Robert A. Heinlein, "Life-Line", and the next, Theodore Sturgeon's, "Ether Breather". As a result, this issue is described as the start of the Golden Age of Science Fiction.

Asimov cited "Black Destroyer" itself and not the issue as the starting point, stating that the presence of his story was "pure coincidence". According to David Drake, "Almost everybody agrees that the Golden Age started with the July, 1939, issue of Astounding, however. That's because its cover story was 'Black Destroyer,' the first published SF by A. E. Van Vogt." Eric Flint also praises it, but notes that Terry Carr was somewhat dismissive of its place in history simply because both were thirteen years old when they read it, and "thirteen ... was the age that defined everybody's 'Golden Age'."

References

Sources

External links
 
 "Black Destroyer" on the Baen Free Library

1939 short stories
Science fiction short stories
Short stories by A. E. van Vogt
Works originally published in Analog Science Fiction and Fact